MasterChef Korea (Korean: 마스터셰프 코리아) is a South Korean competitive reality television cooking show based on the British television cooking game show MasterChef. The first season premiered on O'live Network on 27 April 2012. It ran for four seasons and ended on 19 May 2016.

The winner of MasterChef Korea received 300 million won, shopping credits, a refrigerator and their own cookbook.

Season Summary 

  Male contestants
  Female contestants

Season 1: 27 April – 20 July 2012 

 Winner: Kim Seung-min (김승민)

In the preliminary stages, participants had to prepare a dish and present it to the judges (i.e. Kim Sohyi,  and Noh Hee-young), who would decide if they would advance to the next stage and receive their white aprons. 39 people qualified and were then immediately put through a skills test in cutting onions and an invention test with the ingredient tofu. The remaining top 15 contestants were then put through a series of tests to determine the winner of MasterChef Korea.

Contestants

Season 2 
 Season 2: 10 May – 2 August 2013
 Winner: Choi Kang-rok (최강록)

Contestants 

 Season 3: 10 May – 2 August 2014
 Winner: Choi Kwang Ho (최광호)
 Season 4: 3 March – 19 May 2016
 Winner: Kim Jung Hyun (김정현)

References

External links
 MasterChef Korea
 MasterChef Korea 2
 MasterChef Korea 3
 MasterChef Korea 4

South Korean reality television series
Korea
2012 South Korean television series debuts
South Korean television series based on British television series